Muhammad Naqiuddin bin Ahmad Eunos (born 12 January 1997) is a Singaporean professional footballer who plays as a midfielder for Singapore Premier League club Tanjong Pagar United.

Club career

Young Lions FC 
Naqiuddin signed for Young Lions FC in 2018 after being picked by Fandi Ahmad from the lower league. He stayed in the club for 2 years.

Lion City Sailors FC 
After bring released by Young Lions, he signed for the Lion City Sailors FC.

Tanjong Pagar United FC 
After bring released by Lion City Sailors FC, he signed for the Tanjong Pagar United on 20 December 2022.

International career
Naqiuddin was named in the 2019 SEA Games squad by Fandi Ahmad.

Career statistics

Club

International

U22 International caps

References

Living people
1997 births
Singaporean footballers
Guinean footballers
Association football midfielders
Singapore Premier League players
Home United FC players
Lion City Sailors FC players